This is a list of wars involving the Republic of Tajikistan.

References

 
Tajikistan
Wars